Garow or Garu or Garru or Gerow or Geru may refer to the following places in Iran:
 Garow, Fars
 Geru, Bandar Abbas, Hormozgan Province
 Garu, Byaban, Hormozgan Province
 Garu, Minab, Hormozgan Province
 Geru Siah, Hormozgan Province
 Garu, Qaleh Ganj, Kerman Province (گارو - Gārū)
 Garu, Sabzevar, Razavi Khorasan Province
 Garow, South Khorasan

It may also refer to:
 Geru (river), a river in southeastern Romania